The England cricket team toured Scotland for one One Day International match on 18 August 2008. However, the match was abandoned due to rain.

ODI series

Only ODI

2008
International cricket competitions in 2008
2008 in English cricket
2008 in Scottish cricket
August 2008 sports events in the United Kingdom